Sergio Penagos García (born 19 July 1969) is a Mexican politician formerly affiliated with the National Action Party. As of 2014 he served as Deputy of the LIX Legislature of the Mexican Congress representing Veracruz.

References

1969 births
Living people
Politicians from Veracruz
National Action Party (Mexico) politicians
People from Córdoba, Veracruz
Members of the Congress of Veracruz
21st-century Mexican politicians
Deputies of the LIX Legislature of Mexico
Members of the Chamber of Deputies (Mexico) for Veracruz